Sisters High School (SHS) is a public high school located in Sisters, Oregon, United States.

Academics
In 2008, 94% of the school's seniors received their high school diploma. Of 159 students, 149 graduated, five dropped out, one received a modified diploma, and four were still in high school the following year.

References

High schools in Deschutes County, Oregon
Educational institutions established in 2001
National Register of Historic Places in Deschutes County, Oregon
Public high schools in Oregon
2001 establishments in Oregon
Sisters, Oregon